Zirku Airport  is a private airfield operated by the Zakum Development Company. It serves the oil field at Zirku Island, Abu Dhabi, UAE.

References

Airports in the United Arab Emirates